The Unseen University (UU) is a school of wizardry in Terry Pratchett's Discworld series of fantasy novels. Located in the fictional city of Ankh-Morpork, the UU is staffed by a faculty composed of mostly indolent and inept old wizards. The university's name is a pun on the Invisible College, and many aspects of the university are references to Oxford and Cambridge University. The exploits of the head wizards of the Unseen University are one of the main plot threads in the long-running fantasy series, and have played a central role in 13 novels to date, as well as the four supplementary Science of Discworld novels and the short story, A Collegiate Casting-Out of Devilish Devices.

Motto and Coat of Arms 

The official motto of Unseen University is "Nunc Id Vides, Nunc Ne Vides", loosely translated as "Now you see it, now you don't". The unofficial motto is "η β π", or "Eta Beta Pi" ("Eat a Bit of Pie" or "Eat a Better Pie" (according to the novel Hogfather)).

The coat of arms is: Azure, in chief an open book proper bearing the motto "nunc id vides, nunc ne vides" and in base a wizard's hat gules with stars semy Or. For crest is an owl displayed proper.

As usually rendered, the coat of arms resembles the coat of arms of the University of Oxford.

Wizardry

The title wizard is said to be derived from the archaic word "Wys-ars", meaning one who, at bottom, is very wise. In fact, the older wizards tend not to understand how magic actually works at all, instead relying on centuries of lore to achieve their effects. Younger wizards enthusiastically experiment, pushing back the boundaries of knowledge and making new discoveries about the nature of the universe. They don't understand how magic works either but have much more exciting words to explain why not. These often invoke images of particle physics. The main issue is a generalized worry to where the power actually comes from and what sort of (often eldritch and downright monstrous) entities excessive use can attract.

An eighth son of an eighth son is automatically a wizard. When a wizard nears death – which they know some time in advance – he formally passes on his staff to a newborn wizard. If a wizard happens to have an eighth son, this child will be a "wizard squared" or "Sourcerer", as he generates his own magic and can therefore do just about anything with no effort. This is very dangerous, both because absolute power corrupts absolutely, and because it increases background magic levels considerably. Because of this, wizards generally lack children, due to both rigid celibacy laws and overall non-enabling personality. Besides a mention of Krull (see below) and the prominent Eskarina Smith, all wizards are implicitly male, though this may be a cultural bias of the Unnamed Continent confirmed by narrativium.

Wizards grade magical ability in a series of levels, the highest of which is eight. People without magical ability are "level zero". It was the opinion of many tutors at the time Rincewind was a student that he had a level that was possibly in minus figures, and that the overall magical potential of humanity would actually increase after his death.

Besides the UU, Wizard magic is known to be taught at Bugarup University in Fourecks (Archchancellor, Bill Rincewind) and Krull University in the secretive nation of Krull, as well as the recently established Braseneck College in Pseudopolis, with the name Braseneck being a parody of Oxford's Brasenose College.

Grounds and buildings
The university is a large walled-off complex on the turnwise side of the Ankh, somewhat hubwards of the Isle of Gods. Aside from the Tower of Art, the geography of the UU is somewhat fluid, with rooms shifting and disappearing on a regular basis. It is much larger on the inside than on the outside.

Forming much of the border is the main building, which contains the garden known as the Main Octangle and the Clock Tower housing Old Tom, the university's tongueless octiron (a fictitious magical metal) bell whose strokes silence everything briefly. Turnwise of the main building lies the Library, housing the largest collection of magical texts known on the Disc. This is analogous to the deposit libraries of the UK which include three university libraries. Further hubwards of this is the High Energy Magic Building (a play on high energy physics; the more boffinish of the students and young wizards, such as Ponder Stibbons, work here, breaking magic down into smaller particles). The spot between this building and the Library is the workspace of the university gardener, Modo, a genteel dwarf who was nearly eaten by his own compost pile.

The university holds rowing contests, but because of the normal state of the Ankh, these usually amount to a jogging/sprinting race on the crusted surface. Entering the gardens over the Ankh is the Bridge of Size (a pun on Bridge of Sighs, a name used in various cities including those of Oxbridge), which connects to the Wizard's Pleasaunce (possibly a reference to Parson's Pleasure), another small garden on the Ankh's turnwise side walled off from Hen & Chickens Field. At one point, in the novel Sourcery the Pleasaunce contained a temporary new headquarters for the university staff. 

Entrance and exit into the complex is by one of the gates. These gates close in the evening, and students who like to get out after this have created an alternate opening known as Scholar's Entry. This is a place in the wall where bricks can be slid out to form a usable ladder, and has always been known only to students. However, many students forget that all the staff were, in their time, students themselves. The university is adjacent to Sator Square (a pun on the magical tool the Sator Square).

Tower of Art 
The Tower of Art is the  tower that forms the university's core. It has a total of 8,888 steps up to the top (on the Disc the number 8 has great mystical significance). Originally the Tower was the only building on campus, but teaching has long since moved on to other buildings. The Tower itself is usually only used for astronomical and other observations requiring altitude and the traditional May Morning chorus song from its top (inaudible to anyone but the chorus, but traditionally applauded by all below). While historical wizards were known to build towers for themselves, the builders are unknown. It is certainly older than both the city and the university around it, and some have speculated that it is older than the Disc itself, although evidence for this is scarce. In the novel Sourcery it survives many magical attacks; other, newer towers do not. In the same novel it became important for the heroic wizard Rincewind, as towers help wizards fulfill their potential.

Around the top of it a magical species of raven has developed that is much more intelligent than usual. Quoth, the raven from Soul Music and all the books featuring Susan Sto Helit, is one of these.

The Tower of Art is also the motif of the Ankh-Morpork Post Office one-dollar stamp.

Library
Like the Bodleian Library at Oxford, the UU Library features chained books – although at Oxford this is done to protect the books from the students, whereas at UU it is done to protect the students from the books. The high concentration of magical lore has warped the library interior into a locus of "L-Space" where the concepts of distance and direction are only vaguely defined, with "L-Space" being an allusion to the L-notation describing the complexity of algorithms. It is generally described as resembling an M. C. Escher pastiche of the Bodleian or the British Museum Reading Room. Within L-Space the Library contains every book ever written, possibly written, unwritten and yet to be written. Since the contents of all libraries are in L-Space, it is possible to enter a Library in one city and exit in another. Access to libraries of other times or other realities is restricted to the Librarian himself. In Small Gods, he utilized this access to save several scrolls that would otherwise have been lost when the Library of Ephebe was burned down during an Omnian invasion. People entering the deeper parts of the library usually carry chalk, until the chalk turns into something else.

Octavo
The Octavo, named after a book size and the in-Universe magical power of the number eight, features prominently in the Colour of Magic/Light Fantastic pair of novels. It is described as the Creator's own grimoire, left behind shortly after the Creator completed Creation, and thus the most powerful book of magic on the Discworld. The Eight Great Spells that initially made the Discworld are imprisoned on its pages, giving the book sentience. It is chained down, fastened by eight padlocks: one for each head of an Order of Magic.

When obtained by the university, it was stored in a locked room, off and under the library. The walls are covered with protective symbols and lead octagrams (a reference to precautions taken to shield nuclear reactors; Pratchett once worked for a power generation company). The maximum time an individual can spend in the room is given as 4 minutes and 32 seconds, a figure "deduced after two centuries of cautious experimentation".

As part of Rincewind's backstory, he opens the Octavo in his first year for a bet, whereupon one of the Eight Great Spells leapt from the book and lodged itself into his mind. The failure of the aforementioned security measures is later explained as the actions of the Great Spells themselves. Efforts to remove the spell fail and, unable to learn any other spells (supposedly afraid of sharing his head with a Great Spell) Rincewind is dismissed from the university. In the conclusion of The Light Fantastic, the Spell returns to the Octavo and Rincewind recites all eight Spells to prevent the Discworld's imminent destruction. The book is subsequently swallowed by Rincewind's Luggage, then spat out a few days later.

Staff 
The staff usually come in a group in the books in which they appear, though Rincewind initially followed his own storyline, only being a part of the group in the Science of Discworld books and Unseen Academicals, and the Librarian makes solo appearances in several books. Ridcully and Ponder also appeared in Going Postal and Night Watch. Ridcully alone appears in Thud!. The wizards are referred to by their offices, rather than names. There is a slight reference to this in The Last Continent, when the wizards notice that they not only don't know the Librarian's name, but they also don't know the names of one another. Also, in Unseen Academicals, Ridcully has difficulty remembering the Dean's name, despite having started at UU around the same time.

Archchancellor

The head of Unseen University is the archchancellor, considered an important figure and holds a seat on the Ankh-Morpork council (although this council itself has no power either), in which he acts as a magical advisor to the Patrician of Ankh-Morpork.

The archchancellor of UU is considered the leader of all wizards on the Disc (by those at the UU), the first among equals (i.e. the other eighth-level wizards). There are a total of eight eighth-level wizards, and the number becomes progressively higher as the level decreases. It is common to ascend through the ranks by assassinating superiors. This has been known as the tradition of "dead men's pointy shoes." Unseen University has existed for thousands of years, and the average Archchancellor remains in office for about eleven months.

The current archchancellor is Mustrum Ridcully who assumed the post in Moving Pictures and held it for the rest of the novels. Unlike his predecessors, Ridcully seems to have had a very successful and, above all, injury-free career as Archchancellor. He finally put a halt to the traditional method of promotion simply by being indestructible. This is related to his habit of springing up behind would-be assassins, shouting loudly at them and banging their head repeatedly in the door. He is also known as Ridcully the Brown (a possible reference to "Radagast the Brown" from Lord of the Rings).

At the time he became archchancellor, he had not been seen at the university for forty years, having become a Seventh Level Wizard at the exceptionally young age of twenty-seven, before leaving the university to look after his family's land. As a result, he loves hunting, owns several crossbows and is much given to using the corridors of Unseen University as a shooting range. He also loves sport and was a Rowing Brown for the university in his youth (a parodic reference to the Blue at Oxford and Cambridge Universities).

Since wizards' favourite sports traditionally are things like Competitive Eating and Extreme Napping, other wizards find him very tiring to be around. He is not stupid but finds it very difficult to deal with unexpected information, and generally ignores it until it goes away or becomes someone else's problem. He holds the view that if someone is still trying to explain something to him after about two minutes, it must be worth listening to, and if they give up earlier, it was not worth bothering him with in the first place.

Ridcully has shown the occasional flash of magical skill. For example, in Moving Pictures, the Bursar is surprised to discover Ridcully's adeptness at using a magic mirror, which, like most Discworld scrying devices, is hard to steer. In Soul Music Ridcully improvises, at short notice and with minimal assistance, a slimmed-down version of the rite of AshkEnte for summoning Death (though what he got was Susan, Death's granddaughter – not because the Rite was less effective, however; the plot of the novel was to do with Susan taking over Death's job). It is also implied that he has some degree of practical magic knowledge – instead of using a 'thaumometer' (a device that gives a numerical measurement of a magic field's strength), he licks a finger and notes the colour and size of the small spark it gives off in the air (The Last Continent). He also tends to be more practical than most of his fellow wizards such as when he revives Mr. Teatime by hitting him on the chest before any of his fellow wizards could whip up a spell.

The faculty member he gets on best with seems to be Ponder Stibbons. He never seems to understand what Ponder is saying, and Ponder never expects him to, but at least the young man is doing something, which is more than can be said for the rest of them. He is also quite fond of the Librarian, dismissing a rather snide question about whether it's appropriate for UU's librarian to be an ape with the response, "... he's the only one of you buggers who's awake more'n an hour a day". He also gets along with Watch Commander Samuel Vimes, despite the latter's legendary dislike of magic, as both of them share the belief that the most important thing about magic is knowing when not to use it.

His father was a butcher (Unseen Academicals), and his brother is Hughnon Ridcully, High Priest of Blind Io, and Ankh-Morpork's religious spokesman. While priests and wizards are traditionally at odds due to philosophical differences, neither Ridcully is of a particularly philosophical frame of mind, and they tend to ignore this.

In Lords and Ladies we learn he had a relationship with a young Esme Weatherwax, some fifty years before becoming Archchancellor. It is suggested in the book that, in one of the many parallel universes adjacent to the one on which the Discworld novels take place, Ridcully and Esme Weatherwax are married and have children; though it also implies that they were all probably killed by the Queen of the Elves. He is deeply affected by her death (The Shepherd's Crown).

In the Cosgrove Hall animation of Soul Music he was voiced by Graham Crowden. In 2007's miniseries adaptation of Hogfather he was played by Joss Ackland, and in the 2010 adaptation of Going Postal he was portrayed by Timothy West.

Bursar
(Professor A.A. Dinwiddie, DM (7th), D.Thau., B.Occ., M.Coll. starting in Faust Eric) The Bursar is a quiet, reserved person, who took the job of university treasurer because he had an affinity for numbers (the Archchancellor describes him as "one of those idiot servants") and there was less competition for the role than other faculty posts. 

He took over the job from the previous Bursar, Spelter, after the latter was killed trying to save the library from destruction in Sourcery. Dinwiddie expected that the Bursarship would be a relatively safe office to hold (considering that the normal means of obtaining an office in UU at the time was to assassinate the previous incumbent, but nobody else actually wanted to be bursar) and dreamed of spending the rest of his life quietly adding up rows of figures. Unfortunately, shortly after he became the Bursar, Mustrum Ridcully was appointed Archchancellor. The brashness of Ridcully's personality wore away at the Bursar, a man whose idea of excitement was a soft-boiled egg, and throughout the books his sanity decreased until, by the middle of the series (coinciding with the bizarre events of Reaper Man including the death, zombification and death of the senile 130-year-old wizard Windle Poons), Dr. Dinwiddie is almost completely insane.

He is kept functional, just, by experimental dosages of dried frog pills, though the effect is sometimes erratic. The pills are actually hallucinogens, the idea being that a proper dosage will cause him to hallucinate he is sane. An improper dose causes him to demonstrate symptoms of catatonia or disorganized schizophrenia. Sadly, one of the other things he hallucinates is that he can fly. He being a wizard, this is relatively easy to deal with; the other faculty members simply have to keep him from flying higher than the walls.

Hex temporarily inherited the Bursar's condition after having a "conversation" with him, until Archchancellor Ridcully remedied the matter by convincing the ant-run thinking engine it had just been administered "LOTS OF DRYD FRORG P¼LLS". The Bursar's insanity has become a byword in Ankh-Morpork; "to go Bursar" is "to go crazy".

Dean
The Dean of Pentacles/Archchancellor Henry of Brazeneck College. An incredibly obese man ("...looks like a man who's swallered a bed!" in Moving Pictures) who is generally found in his study reading a grimoire or in the great hall eating. His only job is to sit around, sleep and eat incredibly big dinners. He also attends some of the functions that are held by guilds or clubs around the city on behalf of the university and partakes of other people's big dinners.

According to Ponder Stibbons, he is "normally never nice". One of the Dean's more interesting characteristics is his susceptibility to whatever occult or semi-magical occurrence is happening, as well as any fads or trends – most notably in Soul Music. He is also, when roused into action, very enthusiastic and violent, and is a part-time Watch Special Constable, on the agreement that he will not use magic in the course of his duties. In The Last Continent, he was nicknamed "Two Chairs" by Ridcully, on the basis that he was the only person able to sit on two chairs at once.

In Hogfather, Ridcully is impressed by Hex, the UU "computer", and asks if there is any chance, they could fit a similar one in the Dean's head. Ponder Stibbons then informs him that the resulting brain would weigh ten tons, upon which Ridcully merely remarks "Really? Quite a large crowbar would be in order, then."

In Unseen Academicals it is revealed that The Dean has left UU to become the new Archchancellor of the new Brazeneck University and that his first name is Henry. The Dean became the first person to voluntarily resign from the University – something previously considered unthinkable (as people usually left 'in disgrace, in a box or, in a few cases, in bits') to the point Ridcully regards him as a traitor.

Despite the fact they had been friends since their first day at Unseen University, Ridcully cannot decide what to call the Dean and eventually remembers his name is Henry (over 'Archchancellor', because that 'was out of the question', 'Dean' was 'too obvious an insult', 'Two Chairs' was 'ditto with knobs on' and 'ungrateful, backstabbing, slimy bastard' took too long to say.) By the end of the novel Ridcully is comfortable enough with his presence to refer to him as 'Dean' – which Henry lets slide.

Librarian

The Librarian appeared in the second novel of the series, The Light Fantastic, where he was transformed into an orang-utan as the Octavo fired a beam of magic upwards. On discovering that being an orang-utan had certain advantages for a librarian – he can climb up to high shelves, for example – he refused to be transformed back into a human and has remained an orang-utan ever since. The other wizards have gradually become used to the situation, to the extent that, from Night Watch: "if someone ever reported that there was an orang-utan in the Library, the wizards would probably go and ask the Librarian if he'd seen it."

He is known for his violent reaction to most people calling him a "monkey", as he is technically an ape. He speaks a language whose vocabulary consists primarily of the single word Ook (originally Oook), inflected for simple affirmations and negations. Eeek is also occasionally heard, particularly in moments of panic or rage. Nonetheless, most people seem able to understand him.

As with other members of the UU faculty, the Librarian is referred to uniquely by his office and not by a name. If the Librarian's name were known, he could be changed back into a human, and he has since The Last Continent carefully excised his name from the records of the university. The Discworld Companion hints that he may once have been Dr. Horace Worblehat, which goes most of the way to explaining why he is happier as an orang-utan. The Art of Discworld confirms that the Librarian was indeed Dr. Horace Worblehat, and that his fears of turning back into human are baseless at most. Rincewind is apparently the only wizard who still remembers the Librarian's name, but he has agreed not to tell anyone, possibly because the Librarian is capable of bouncing the head of a man on the pavement when holding him by the ankle.

The Librarian served a brief stint in the City Watch during the reign of terror caused by the dragon of Ankh-Morpork, where he helped to rescue Sam Vimes from the Patrician's cell. He retained an honorary position with the Watch and is considered as of Thud! to be one of the first members of the 'Specials' – the Ankh-Morpork City Militia. In Soul Music, he joined the Band with Rocks In since his large hands and wide reach make him an excellent keyboard player. He remains the chief organist for the Unseen University and does not consider an organ complete without a vox diabolica stop, a thunder pedal, and a 256-ft Earthquake pipe. Fortunately, the Johnson organ in the Great Hall of Unseen University is one of the few organs thus equipped.

The Librarian is a member of a small elite group of senior Librarians of Time and Space who have the knowledge and ability to travel through L-Space, an extradimensional space that connects all libraries and other large accumulations of books. He used this knowledge to save books from the great library of Ephebe in Small Gods and to enter our world via the library of Sir Francis Walsingham in The Science of Discworld II. The very strict rules that members of this group are pledged to enforce are:
 Silence.
 Books must be returned no later than the last date shown.
 Do not meddle with the nature of causality.

The Librarian has been known to break both the first and third rules on occasion, but he is adamant about the second.

In Men at Arms, it is stated that the Librarian likes being the best man at weddings because he is allowed to kiss the bridesmaids and they are not allowed to run away; in Lords and Ladies the Librarian served as the best man for Magrat and Verence. The cover of the Discworld picture book Where's My Cow? indicates that it has won the Ankh-Morpork Librarian's award.

The Librarian tends to spend his leisure hours at the Mended Drum, where he drinks quietly unless provoked, eats prodigious quantities of peanuts, and plays a ruthless game of Cripple Mr Onion with anyone foolish enough to take him on.

The Librarian appears in orang-utan form in the video games Discworld and Discworld II. In the 2008 TV adaptation of The Colour of Magic and The Light Fantastic by Sky One, he appears in both human and orang-utan form. His human form is played by Nicolas Tennant, who had previously played Corporal Nobbs in Terry Pratchett's Hogfather. This adaptation also establishes his name as Horace Worblehat.

Ponder Stibbons
Head of Inadvisably Applied Magic, Praelector and Reader in Invisible Writings, the Master of Traditions, the Camerlengo of Unseen University, and among other positions, the keeper of Hex, the university's computer, Ponder Stibbons fulfills the role of the one person in the organisation who knows what's going on. Originally portrayed as an obsessive geeky student, who passed the university's graduation exam because he was allowed to take the test paper of the absent slacker genius, Victor Tugelbend, (which consisted solely of the question "What is your name?"), after a mishap with his own; he would become the head of the students whose experiments with High Energy Magic would lead to the creation of Hex, and eventually a member of the Faculty where the more senior members generally treat him as the odd-jobs man. Of course at this point he's effectively the only person who can get anything done (often without the consent of the other Faculty members) and the right-hand man of Archchancellor Ridcully. In The Science of Discworld, Stibbons led the project to "split the thaum" (the magical equivalent of the atom). It is revealed in Unseen Academicals that, due to the number of positions he holds (because somebody has to), Stibbons has accumulated sufficient votes to technically control the University Council – causing the Archchancellor to remark "Didn't anyone notice you were getting all this power?" His entry in The New Discworld Companion states:
originally rather lazy by nature, he seems to have blossomed to become the youngest and most depressingly keen member of the faculty ... as one of the few wizards at the University with his head screwed on in any fashion, he appears, quite against his will, to be in the front line.
He doesn't support the theory of a beard as a sign of knowledge because he has been unable to grow one himself. In the film version of Hogfather he is portrayed by Ed Coleman.

Stibbons appears in the video game Discworld II, in the High Energy Facility. He is characterized differently than in the books, as apparently the long hours of working with Hex's thaumic accelerator caused his brain to "melt". This is evidenced by his erratic speech patterns and verbal tics, as well as his denials that he is being adversely affected: he reacts to Rincewind's remarks with "There's no truth at all that splitting thaums causes the brain to *woof* melt! No truth at all! Haaaah! Every day, and in every way, I'm getting BETTER AND BETTER AND BETTER! They laughed at me and said I was mad, you know. HAVE A NICE DAY! HAVE A NICE DAY! HAVE A REAL, REAL, REAL NICE NIGHT-NO-DAY! HA HA HA HA HA!!!!!".

Rincewind

Rincewind holds the Chair of Experimental Serendipity, the Chair for the Public Misunderstanding of Magic, and the positions of Professor of Virtual Anthropology, Egregious Professor of Cruel and Unusual Geography, Reader in Slood Dynamics, Fretwork Teacher, Lecturer in Approximate Accuracy, and Health and Safety Officer. These apparently unwanted positions were awarded to Rincewind provided that he does not receive any salary. Prior to receiving these titles, Rincewind held the post of Assistant Librarian, but it is unclear whether or not he retains the office. Rincewind is often concerned with his life, as many people all across Discworld have attempted to take it. In the film version of The Colour of Magic he is portrayed by David Jason.

Doctor Hix
 Dr John Hix – 'Hicks with an X' in Unseen Academicals, after changing his name from Hicks because it didn't suit his position. Dr Hix is a necromancer. Since necromancy is officially banned in Ankh-Morpork, he is instead the Head of the Department of Postmortem Communications (although he acknowledges this is just a fancy way of saying necromancy). Dr Hix has one member of staff, a reanimated skeleton called Charlie, who helps procure the tools of the trade (which are mostly items from the joke shop down the road). Dr Hix did have another member of staff, the late Professor Flead, but insorcized him into the Pink Pussycat Club at the end of Making Money (the Professor haunts the club, and the club does not mind the loss of one chair out of the club's seating capacity). Dr Hix frequently misbehaves, performs evil deeds and makes comments in bad taste as he is required to under university statute, a fact which the other members of UU grudgingly accept. He uses the phrase "Skull ring, remember?" as an excuse for his misbehavior, much like the Patrician's use of the phrase, "Tyrant, remember?".

Hix may be a parody of Peter Higgs.

Hex

Hex is the UU's first mainframe computer, though instead of RAM, it is powered by a waterwheel inside a ram skull, and its mouse is an actual mouse. Its "brain" consists of a series of glass tubes filled with ants, which form its processor, and a beehive in a back room, which constitutes its hard drive. It bears a sticker up front saying that there is an anthill inside (a parody of the advertising slogan "Intel Inside"). Initially just a computer, it has gradually developed more of a personality over the course of the series. Ponder Stibbons has by default become the person in charge of developing and operating Hex, though he admits that Hex largely develops itself.

Other staff 
Other staff at the UU include:
 the Senior Wrangler (described in Reaper Man as "a philosopher who looks like a horse")
 the Chair of Indefinite Studies
 the Lecturer in Recent Runes
 the Chair of Oblique Frogs
 the Professor of Revolvings
 the Professor of Extreme Horticulture
 the Professor of Applied Anthropics
 the Reader in Esoteric Studies
 the Lecturer in Creative Uncertainty
Professor of Cruel and Unusual Geography (died in The Last Continent, position now held by Rincewind)
 the Professor of Dust, Fluff, and Miscellaneous Particles
 the Lecturer in Vindictive Astronomy
 the Professor of Recondite Architecture and Origami Map-Folding
 Ladislav Pelc, Prehumous Professor of Morbid Bibliomancy
 Professor Goitre, Posthumous Professor of Morbid Bibliomancy
 Devious H. "Dragonbreath" Collabone
 Professor Flead
 Professor Ritornello, Master of the Music
 Professor Bengo Macarona, visiting professor from Genua and extraordinary football player
 Mrs Whitlow, the domineering head of the kitchen
 Modo, the gardener

Past archchancellors 
Notable former archchancellors include:

 Alberto Malich: The first Archchancellor and university founder; sent himself to the land of Death when he performed the Rite of AshkEnte backwards. Staying in Death's Domain, he became Death's Assistant and Butler. Returned (briefly) in Mort and Soul Music, and for rather longer during the events described in Hogfather when he appeared as Pixie Albert to Death's Hogfather. In the film version of Hogfather he is portrayed by David Jason.
 Chancellor Galder Weatherwax: A distant cousin of Granny Weatherwax (they have never met), he is Chancellor for the first half of The Light Fantastic. Note that in The Light Fantastic, he is referred to as Chancellor, but Ridcully subsequently upgrades him to Archchancellor in Lords and Ladies, when talking to aforementioned Granny Weatherwax. He is the 304th Chancellor of the university. In the film version of The Colour of Magic he is portrayed by James Cosmo.
 Archchancellor Ymper Trymon: Archchancellor for the second half of The Light Fantastic. Nearly causes the end of the world. In the film version of The Colour of Magic he is portrayed by Tim Curry.
 Coin the Sourcerer: Archchancellor during Sourcery. Also nearly causes the end of the world.

Others include Cutangle in Equal Rites, Virrid Wayzygoose for one night in Sourcery, expert on the Lost Continent of Ku Ezrolith Churn during Faust Eric, Sloman, who discovered the Special Theory of Slood, and Preserved Bigger, whose conditional bequest necessitated a game of football in Unseen Academicals.

Past students 
 Eskarina Smith, commonly known as Esk, is the main character in Equal Rites, where she became the Unseen University's first and only known female graduate. Esk went on to work on a new kind of magic based on not using it at all, in the company of wunderkind wizard Simon. Although she was the pivotal character in Equal Rites, she was not seen or mentioned again until I Shall Wear Midnight, published a full 23 years later, where she was described as being both old and young due to her mastery of time travel. Though it is unclear whether or not she's a practising part of the Ankh Morpork coven, perhaps due to her shared witchiness/wizardliness, Tiffany Aching is forewarned by Mrs. Proust that she would be contacted by her. In the future, she becomes a close friend of the adult Tiffany Aching. Esk is mentioned briefly again in The Shepherd's Crown, with an (unnamed) son.
 Victor Tugelbend (in Moving Pictures)
 Adrian Turnipseed, aka Big Mad Drongo, aka Big Mad Adrian (to Archchancellor Ridcully only) (in Soul Music, The Last Continent, Hogfather and others). A geeky wizard who works with Ponder Stibbons at the High Energy Magic Building. By the time of Unseen Academicals Adrian Turnipseed was working for Braseneck College and fulfilling an equivalent role there to UU's Ponder Stibbons.
 Mr. Sideney: A member of Teatime's gang who break into the Tooth Fairy's castle. In the film adaptation of Hogfather, he is portrayed by Nigel Planer.

Past wizards

Drum Billet
Drum is a wizard in Equal Rites, he continues the tradition of bequeathing his staff before his death to the eighth son of an eighth son. The son turns out to be a girl, Eskarina 'Esk' Smith. Later on Drum is reincarnated as an ant living under Unseen University. 

The name is a pleonasm, as "Drum" is slang for "House" in some English dialects, and "Billet" is a more typical military term for housing, making the name, House House.

Windle Poons
Windle Poons was a very old wizard, usually moving on his monstrous wheelchair. He first appeared in Moving Pictures in which his physical and mental state could be described as "invalid, deaf, wandering of mind and hot on the ladies' behinds in his wheelchair". Strangely, it resulted in friendly relations with Ridcully, since Windle didn't mind being shouted at, and he was also used to people ignoring his questions. He died at the age of 130 shortly after his farewell party, but thanks to Death's absence he returned briefly as a zombie, being more lucid than he had been during the latter half of his life.

References

External links 
 Discworld & Pratchett Wiki

Discworld organisations
Discworld locations
Fictional magic schools
Fictional universities and colleges

de:Figuren und Schauplätze der Scheibenwelt-Romane#Unsichtbare Universität